The Bharbhunja/ Bhurji/ Bhojwal/ bhujwa (भुजवा/ भुर्जी/ भोजवाल/ भूज) are a largely Hindu caste found in North India and Maharashtra. They are also known as Kalenra in Maharashtra. A small number are also found in the Terai region of Nepal.

Origin 
The Bharbhunja derive their name from the Hindi word bhunja, which means gram, and the community was involved with roasting gram. They were said to have originally belonged to the Agrawal caste, but split off from them when they took to roasting gram. There is no intermarriage between the two communities now. The majority of the Bharbhunja are Hindu, except a section in Gujarat and Uttar Pradesh, who form a separate community of Muslim Bharbhunja. A small number in Punjab and Haryana . Those in Haryana and Punjab speak Punjabi.

In Maharashtra, there are three distinct communities of the Bharbhunja, the Bhad Bhunjari, the Pardeshi Bhunjari and the Bhoi Bhunjari. All the three groups claim their origin from different regions, with Bhad Bhunjari claiming their origin from Gujarat, the Pardeshi from Madhya Pradesh, and the Bhoi from Rajasthan. Each of these groups is endogamous, and do not intermarry. They are also separated by language, with the Bhad Bhunjari still speaking Gujarati, while the other groups speak Marathi. The Bhad Bhunjari are now found mainly in the districts of Nasik, Pune, Thane, Ahmednagar and the city of Mumbai.

Present circumstances 
Like other occupational castes, the community has seen a decline in their traditional occupation. A majority of the community are now wage labourers, with a small number being petty businessmen and some has become Engineers, Doctors and some are now well settled in abroad. However, the decline in their traditional occupation has not seen a weakening of their identity. The community remains endogamous, and practices clan exogamy. Furthermore, there is no intermarriage between Sikh and Hindu Bharbhunja, and the two are now practically distinct communities.

The Maharashtra Bharbhunja are still involved in their traditional occupation of selling parched grain. A significant numbers are now businessmen, and they were one of the few artisan castes to have made the change over to modern economy fairly successfully. The Bharbhunja are strictly endogamous, and practice clan exogamy. A few of their clans are the Parmar, Powar, Parotia, Jadhav, Shinde and Chowhan, which are also used as surnames.

They are in the Central list of OBC in many states.

Uttar Pradesh 
In Uttar Pradesh, the Bhabhunja are referred to as the Bhurji. They are still involved in their traditional occupation of grain parching. Wages of the parcher is fixed in terms of the proportion of grain that is parched. They purchase the grain from agrarian castes such as the Kurmi, Jat, Ahir, Rajput. The Bhurji live in multi-caste villages, often occupying their own quarters.

The Bhurji are strictly endogamous, and practice clan exogamy. The Bhurji are Hindu, and their tribal deities include Panchon Pir and Baram Baba. They are found throughout Uttar Pradesh, but their place is taken by the Kandu in eastern Uttar Pradesh, another caste traditionally associated with grain parching. The community speak the Khari boli dialect in the west, and Bhojpuri in the east.

See also
 Bharbhunja (Muslim)

References 

Social groups of Haryana
Social groups of Uttar Pradesh
Indian castes